Reading Football Club played the 2008–09 season in the Football League Championship, having been relegated on the final day of the 2007–08 Premier League season. Despite a strong start to the season, especially at home, Reading were unable to secure promotion at the first attempt; a poor run of form in 2009 saw Reading win just 5 of their last 17 league games, the Royals finishing 4th in the league. Reading were defeated 3–0 on aggregate by Burnley in the play-off semi-finals.

Review and events

Pre-season
Reading opened their pre-season with an away game against Didcot Town, winning 9–0, with nine different scorers, including a fan who won the opportunity to play at a charity auction. After further away wins at Forest Green Rovers (2–0), Havant & Waterlooville (1–0) and MK Dons (2–1), Reading went on a three-game friendly tour of Sweden, winning their three games against FC Trollhättan (4–1) in which Leroy Lita scored all four, against Lerkils IF (1–0) and against Halmstads BK (3–1) in which new signing Noel Hunt scored for the first time, ultimately scoring two.  Reading's last friendly, and only home friendly, was against Aston Villa, and finished 1–1. It was Reading's only pre-season game that they did not win.

August
Reading's league campaign began with a 0–0 draw at promoted Nottingham Forest. In a game of few chances, Kevin Doyle came closest for the Royals, glancing a header goalwards from a Stephen Hunt cross, that Forest goalkeeper Paul Smith did well to tip on to the crossbar.

Two days later, the Royals enjoyed their first victory of the season, as a late Noel Hunt goal, on his competitive debut for Reading, secured a 2–1 victory at Dagenham and Redbridge in the 1st round of the League Cup. James Henry had opened the scoring for Reading in the first half, with his first goal for the club, tapping home after Shane Long had beaten the Dagenham goalkeeper to a cross.

Reading's first home league match followed on 16 August, a game the Royals deservedly won 2–0, Ibrahima Sonko crashing home two headers, one in each half, both from Stephen Hunt corners.

A week later, the Royals lost a thrilling game 2–4 against Charlton Athletic. Matt Holland and Andy Gray's penalty gave the Addicks a 2–0 lead but Ibrahima Sonko kept up his scoring form with a thumping header before half-time. Stephen Hunt's retaken penalty completed the comeback for Reading, but further goals for Luke Varney and Hameur Bouazza gave Charlton all three points.

The Royals returned to the Madesjki on 26 August with a thumping 5–1 victory over Luton Town in the League Cup 2nd Round. Noel Hunt opened the scoring after nodding in brother Stephen Hunt's cross. Soon later it was the other way around, Noel Hunt sliding in a cross and Stephen Hunt slotted home. Alex Pearce, Jem Karacan and James Henry all got their first goals for the club. A consolation for Luton was scored by Ryan Charles.

September
The month started at Portman Road, Ipswich. Reading's bad away form continued as The Royals lost 2–0 to the hands of Ipswich Town. The game was followed up by the biggest win of the season, so far, as Reading forced six passed Sheffield Wednesday. The Royals were 2–0 up within 10 minutes, Kevin Doyle scoring them both. André Bikey got the third on the half hour mark. Noel Hunt got the fourth on the fiftieth minute. Doyle scored his third of the game and two minutes later Reading were 6–0 up. It stayed that way until the end of the match.

Watford. Reading came to Watford sitting fourth in the Championship. Reading took the lead on the 13th minute. The goal was scored by no-one! The goal was not claimed for by any Reading player. Watford soon went 2–1 up and an 89th minute spot kick was turned in by S. Hunt.

Reading played a cup side in the League Cup as the Royals headed to Stoke to play the Premier League side Stoke City. Reading battled hard only losing to the Premier League side on spot kicks, 4–3, after a 2–2 draw.

Reading played Swansea City and a 4–0 win set up a game with Wolverhampton Wanderers. The Royals went 1–0 up when an own goal by Wolverhampton Wanderers started off a hammering for Wolves. André Bikey made it 2–0 and Kalifa Cissé made a Reading win a game to forget for Wolverhampton Wanderers.

October

Burnley came to Reading. Reading won the game 3–1. The Hunt Brothers scored two and Shane Long made it 3–0. Burnley scored a goal, but it was too little to late. Away days. Reading lost to the hands of Preston North End 2–1. Mix ups saw a loss come to Reading's hands.

A home game to Doncaster Rovers followed. The Royals only won 2–1. This happened after Reading going 1–0 up, then Doncaster scored. One minute later the Royals scored to win the match.

A draw to Queens Park Rangers in front of the Sky Sports cameras at home, 0–0, and a loss, 1–0, away to Burnley rounded off a bad month for the Royals, home and away.

November

Reading returned to winning ways at Ashton Gate as the Royals opened November with a 4–1 win away to Bristol City. Kevin Doyle (twice) and Noel Hunt scored from close range, before Kalifa Cissé added Reading's fourth, smashing the ball into the top right-hand corner of the goal from outside of the penalty area. Reading's excellent home form continued the following weekend, Doyle (2) and Noel Hunt again got on the scoresheet in a 3–0 victory over Derby County.

The Royals secured a third successive victory at Bramall Lane the following weekend, Kalifa Cissé opening the scoring in the 5th minute, before a Kevin Doyle header, just before half-time, completed a 2–0 win at Sheffield United. Reading then lost to Southampton at home 2–1. The Royals' 1st home defeat of the season so-far. Kébé scored his 1st Reading goal.  The Royals then headed off to Wales to play Cardiff City. Reading went 1–0 and 2–1 down. At 1–1, Reading were down to 10 men as André Bikey got sent off. Reading's scores were Kevin Doyle and Brynjar Gunnarsson in a 2–2 draw.

December

Reading were playing Coventry City at home in front of the Sky Sports Cameras. The Royals went 1–0 down, but came back to win 3–1. Reading won 1–0 at Barnsley and at home to Blackpool. A late rally by Reading help them win 2–0 at home to Norwich City. Reading moved into 2nd as Reading won 3–1 at then 2nd place Birmingham City.

Reading then had a home draw, 1–1, to Cardiff City. The Welsh side went 1–0 in the 89th minute, but Reading's keeper Adam Federici scored in the 6th minute of injury time. Reading then drew 1–1 at Southampton.

January

Reading met Cardiff City for the third time in six weeks in the FA Cup third round, and a largely second-string side were defeated 2–0 at Ninian Park, to end the Royals' eight-match unbeaten run.
The Royals returned to the Madejski Stadium for the first league match of the calendar year, completing a 4–0 victory over Watford. Chris Armstrong opened the scoring with his first ever goal for Reading, before Kevin Doyle, Noel Hunt and Leroy Lita, back from Norwich, added to the tally. A 2–0 defeat at Welsh side Swansea City followed, to end a run of 9 league matches unbeaten for Reading, before league leaders Wolves were beaten 1–0 at the Madejski Stadium, the game decided by a second-minute own-goal scored by Wolves' Neill Collins. The result closed the gap between Wolves and Reading, in 2nd place, to two points. January ended with a goalless draw at Loftus Road, as Reading and Q.P.R. drew 0–0 for the second time this season.

February

On the 6th of the month it was revealed that Bobby Convey had left the club by mutual consent. A second consecutive 0–0 draw followed, as the Royals were held at home by Preston. On 13 February it was revealed that Ivar Ingimarsson would be out injured for the rest of the season, scheduled for surgery on a knee cartilage problem. Reading's goal drought continued two weeks later, at home to Bristol City, as the Royals lost 2–0, a second home defeat of the season. Nottingham Forest visited the Madejski Stadium on 28 February, as the Royals slumped to a second straight home defeat, and a sixth consecutive game without scoring.

March

Reading secured a first win in five games under floodlights at Hillsborough, defeating Sheffield Wednesday 2–1, Kevin Doyle heading home from a corner, and Shane Long scoring the winner with nine minutes left.

The Royals headed to Home Park, Plymouth to play Plymouth Argyle. Reading went 1–0 down, but Alex Pearce scored two minutes later. Argyle went 2–1 up and in the 80th minute, Jimmy Kebe scored, through the keepers legs.

Reading played Charlton Athletic, at home, next. Reading drew 2–2 with two goals from young Irish striker Shane Long. However the Royals were denied victory by a last gasp equaliser. Reading next lost to Ipswich Town 1–0. The Royals went 1–0 down just 1 minute after the break. That meant the Royals went into a three match winless run with renewed purpose.

However, that was forgotten in midweek as they won 1–0 at Doncaster Rovers, thanks to a late Dave Kitson winner eight minutes from time. Kitson had returned to the club on loan, as did Glen Little.

The Royals ended the month with successive goalless draws, against Crystal Palace, eventually dropping into 4th place after Sheffield United's win over Barnsley.

April

The first game of April was away to Coventry City which ended in bore draw of 0–0. Both teams creating very little in another disappointing performance from the Royals.

On 10 April 2009, Sheffield United travelled to the Madjeski for an evening game in a real six-pointer with both teams needing the win to help secure that valuable play-off place. It ended in Reading losing 1–0 with Brian Howard scoring a scrappy goal on the hour mark.

On 13 April 2009, the Royals travelled to Bloomfield Road to face Blackpool and after taking a 2–0 lead, eventually drew 2–2. Jem Karacan scored his first goal of the season and league goal for the Royals.

A goalless draw with Barnsley at home meant Reading had now gone 7 home games without a win. However, the Royals showed a return to form on the following Tuesday night with a 2–0 win at Derby County, Dave Kitson and Shane Long the goalscorers.

With results having gone their way at the weekend, Reading went into their Monday night game with Norwich City knowing that only a win would keep their hopes of automatic promotion alive. Shane Long inspired Reading to a 2–0 win with both goals, both of them headers from Jimmy Kebe crosses. Reading, 4th, needed to win going into a clash with Birmingham City, 2nd. Reading lost 2–1 and Birmingham went up. Reading need to win to go up to the Premier League at the first attempt, and Sheffield United didn't win against Crystal Palace. United drew 0–0. If the Royals had won they would have gone up on Goal-Difference.

May

André Bikey was sent off as Reading lost the first leg of their play-off semi-final at Burnley by a single goal. Bikey was sent off for a stamp on Robbie Blake, minutes after pulling back Burnley striker Steve Thompson to gift the Clarets the winning penalty, scored by Graham Alexander. Burnley advanced to the final at Wembley three days later as Reading lost the second leg 2–0, goals from Martin Paterson, and Thompson, sealing Burnley's win. Hours after Burnley winning the game Steve Coppell resigned as Manager of the club.

Squad

Out on loan

Left club during season

Transfers

In

Loans in

Out

Loans out

Released

Competitions

Overview

Championship

Results summary

Results by round

Fixtures and results

Playoffs

Semi-finals

League table

FA Cup

Football League Cup

Player details

Appearances

|-
|colspan="14"|Players who appeared for Reading no longer at the club:

|}

Starting 11

Goal Scorers

Disciplinary Record

References

Reading F.C. seasons
Reading